Glyphipterix semilunaris is a moth in the family Glyphipterigidae. It was described by Edith Wollaston in 1879 and is known from Saint Helena in the South Atlantic Ocean.

References

Glyphipterigidae
Moths described in 1879
Moths of Africa